San Juan Moderno is one of the forty subbarrios of Santurce, San Juan, Puerto Rico.

Demographics
In 2000, San Juan Moderno had a population of 1,083.

In 2010, San Juan Moderno had a population of 925 and a population density of 23,125 persons per square mile.

See also
 
 List of communities in Puerto Rico

References

Santurce, San Juan, Puerto Rico
Municipality of San Juan